Head of the Herd is a band from Vancouver, British Columbia, Canada. The band plays a combination of blues influenced alternative rock.

As of June 2015, Head of the Herd was in studio recording their album Birds On The Roof, to be released September 25, 2015.  They are working in the south of Georgia, US with producer Mark Neill, notable for his work with The Black Keys & J Roddy Walston and the Business; in the UK at Rockfield Studios with producer Ian Davenport, notable for his work with Band Of Skulls, Radiohead's Phillip Selway & Other Lives; and in Vancouver with producer Garth Richardson, notable for his work with Rage Against the Machine, Red Hot Chili Peppers, & Biffy Clyro. The album will also have songs produced by the band's singer Neu Mannas.

The band have toured with Guns N' Roses, Alice In Chains, Theory of a Deadman, played major festivals (Squamish Valley Music Festival, Shorefest, Kitchener Blues Fest, Boonstock) & done headlining tours since the release of their sophomore album, By This Time Tomorrow.  Prior to this album's release, the band toured in support of their debut album On the House, playing throughout the West, including at TelusFest, the Grey Cup Festival, and opening for The Sheepdogs and The Trews.  All this shortly after their formation in June 2010.

In 2014 Head of the Herd won an award for Best New Rock Group at the 2014 Canadian Radio Music Awards in Toronto.  That year they toured the festival circuit including performing at the Squamish Valley Music Festival, headlined tours, and supported others.

The band was created over a trip to Boise, Idaho to watch a college football game. "Hours spent showing each other demos on the drive and cowboy boots full of whiskey flasks at the game, led to a fuzzy yet memorable weekend that marked the genesis of the band."

Band members
Neu Mannas - lead vocals & guitar (Live). + bass, piano, organ & percussion (in studio) (2010–present)
Clay Frank - Guitar, Harmonica & Percussion (Live & In Studio) (2010–present)
Matty Carolei - Drums (Live & In Studio) (2013–present) 
Brittany Willacy  - Piano, organ, and background vocals (Live) (2013–present) 
Cory Curtis - Bass and background vocals (Live) (2014–present)

Albums 

For Head of the Herd's debut album, On the House, all instruments were played by Neu & Clay, produced in Vancouver by Neu Mannas, & released February 1, 2011.  All songs were written by Neu Mannas & Clay Frank, excluding the cover of 25 Minutes to Go, a song written by Shel Silverstein & made famous by Johnny Cash on his live album At Folsom Prison.

The band's second album, By This Time Tomorrow. developed in conjunction with music producer Garth Richardson, and Rick Jackett and James Black of Finger Eleven, missed its June 4, 2013 release date, but was later successfully launched on October 22, 2013, distributed through Universal Music Group.  The album's first single, "By This Time Tomorrow" featuring Jasmin Parkin of Mother Mother, was used by CBC's Hockey Night in Canada for the intro to the Chicago Blackhawks and Detroit Red Wings playoff game on May 27, 2013. It also reached #1 for rock songs played on Canadian radio, according to Nielsen Broadcast Data Systems   The following singles "Ain't My Day" and "We Could Get Together" peaked at #15 & #11 respectively on the Canadian Active Rock Chart  The session with Rick & James was recorded at Coalition Studios in Toronto, Ontario, while the session with Garth Richardson was recorded at The Farm Studios in Vancouver, British Columbia.

All songs on By This Time Tomorrow were written by Neu Mannas & Clay Frank.  Most of which were written at Freedom Lane Studios in Coeur D'Alene, Idaho. The album was mixed by Ben Kaplan & Mastered by Brock McFarlane (CPS Mastering), both in Vancouver.

Discography

On the House
On the House is the first album released by Head of the Herd. It was released on February 1, 2011 independently. All songs written by Neu Mannas & Clay Frank (excluding 25 Minutes to Go).

Track listing

By This Time Tomorrow
By This Time Tomorrow is the second album released by Head of the Herd. It was released on October 22, 2013, distributed in Canada through Universal Music Group.  All songs written by Neu Mannas & Clay Frank.
Track listing

Deluxe Edition (2014)

Birds on the Roof
Birds On The Roof is the third studio album released by Head of the Herd.  Set to release on September 25, 2015 by Head of the Herd Music Inc. distributed in Canada through Universal Music Group.  All songs written by Neu Mannas & Clay Frank.
Track listing

Deluxe Edition

References

External links 
Head of the Herd Official Website

Musical groups from Vancouver
Canadian blues rock musical groups
Musical groups established in 2010
2010 establishments in British Columbia